Martín Gonzalo del Campo  (born 24 May 1975 in Montevideo) is a former Uruguayan footballer.

Club career
Del Campo played for River Plate in the Primera División de Argentina.

International career
Del Campo made five appearances for the senior Uruguay national football team during 1999, including four matches at the Copa América 1999.

Honours

National Team
 
 1999 Copa América: 2nd place

References

Camacua

External links 
 

1975 births
Living people
Uruguayan footballers
Uruguay international footballers
1999 Copa América players
Montevideo Wanderers F.C. players
Club Nacional de Football players
C.A. Bella Vista players
Club Atlético River Plate footballers
Atlético de Rafaela footballers
Tiro Federal footballers
Club Olimpia footballers
Uruguayan Primera División players
Argentine Primera División players
Expatriate footballers in Argentina
Expatriate footballers in Paraguay
Footballers from Montevideo
Association football defenders